Charles Burnham Cochran was the fifteenth intendant (mayor) of Charleston, South Carolina, serving one term from 1805 to 1806. He was elected on September 9, 1805. At the time, he lived at the house then-numbered 67 Meeting Street, Charleston, South Carolina. He had previously served as the federal marshal of the South Carolina District from 1795 to 1802. In 1806, he was elected treasurer of South Carolina for the lower division. Cochran died on August 21, 1833. He is buried at the Cathedral of St. Luke and St. Paul in Charleston, South Carolina.

References

Mayors of Charleston, South Carolina
1766 births
1833 deaths